Nasser Chamed (born 4 October 1993) is a Comorian professional footballer who plays as a winger for Liga I club Chindia Târgoviște and the Comoros national team.

International career
Chamed was called to represent Comoros in May 2014.

Career statistics

International

Scores and results list Comoros' goal tally first, score column indicates score after each Chamed goal.

References

External links

1993 births
Living people
Footballers from Lyon
Association football wingers
Citizens of Comoros through descent
Comorian footballers
Comoros international footballers
French footballers
French sportspeople of Comorian descent
Ligue 2 players
Liga I players
LB Châteauroux players
Nîmes Olympique players
CS Gaz Metan Mediaș players
AFC Chindia Târgoviște players
Comorian expatriate footballers
Comorian expatriate sportspeople in France
Expatriate footballers in France
Comorian expatriate sportspeople in Romania
Expatriate footballers in Romania